Martin Prázdnovský (born 22 October 1975 in Streda nad Bodrogom) is a Slovak former cyclist.

Major results

2004 
1st Stage 3 Giro del Friuli-Venezia Giulia
2nd Grand Prix Kooperativa
3rd Overall Tour de Hongrie
1st Stage 1
3rd Grand Prix Bradlo
2005
1st  Road race, National Road Championships
1st Overall Grand Prix Cycliste de Gemenc
1st Prologue & Stage 2
1st Overall Okolo Slovenska
1st Overall Tour of Bulgaria
1st Stage 1
2nd Overall Tour of Turkey
2nd Overall Tour de Hongrie
2006
1st Overall Grand Prix Cycliste de Gemenc
1st Prologue & Stage 2
1st Overall Tour de Guadeloupe
2008
3rd Road race, National Road Championships
2009
1st Stage 3 Tour of Bulgaria

References

External links

1975 births
Living people
Slovak male cyclists
People from Trebišov District
Sportspeople from the Košice Region